Jonathan Glenn Coffman (born July 28, 1973) is an American college basketball coach, currently men's head coach at Purdue University Fort Wayne. Coffman was hired as an assistant to head coach IPFW head coach Tony Jasick in 2011. When Jasick chose to leave for Jacksonville in 2014, Coffman was promoted to head coach. After earning a berth in the 2015 CollegeInsider.com Postseason Tournament in his first season, Coffman led the Mastodons to a share of the Summit League regular season championship in 2015–16 and was named the league's Coach of the Year.

Head coaching record

References

External links
IPFW bio

1973 births
Living people
American men's basketball coaches
American men's basketball players
Colgate Raiders men's basketball coaches
College men's basketball head coaches in the United States
College of Charleston Cougars men's basketball coaches
Emory and Henry Wasps men's basketball coaches
Purdue Fort Wayne Mastodons men's basketball coaches
Point guards
Stetson Hatters men's basketball coaches
Washington and Lee Generals men's basketball players